Dimitar Todorov (born 15 September 1957) is a Bulgarian former football player and the current football manager of Pavlikeni.

Coaching career
Todorov managed his hometown club Vidima-Rakovski Sevlievo on several occasions. On 20 July 2017, he was appointed as manager of Third League club Pavlikeni, taking the role effectively as of 24 July.

Honours

As a coach 
 Vidima-Rakovski
 B PFG
 Winner (1): 2009-10

References

Living people
1957 births
People from Sevlievo
Bulgarian footballers
Bulgarian football managers
PFC Vidima-Rakovski Sevlievo players
PFC Spartak Pleven players
Association footballers not categorized by position